Fenlands is a 1945 British short film directed by Ken Annakin for the Ministry of Information's Pattern of Britain series. It documents the Fenlands of East Anglia, and their change from swamplands to farmlands.

References

External links

1945 films
1945 short films
Films directed by Ken Annakin
British black-and-white films
British short documentary films
1945 documentary films
1940s short documentary films
1940s English-language films
1940s British films